249 Squadron may refer to:

No. 249 Squadron RAF
249th Airlift Squadron, USAF
BR Battle of Britain class 34073 249 Squadron, a steam loco named after the RAF squadron